Jamaal Myers is a Canadian lawyer and politician who was elected to represent Ward 23 Scarborough North on Toronto City Council following the 2022 municipal election.

Background
Myers was born in Scarborough to Jamaican parents and raised in Toronto Community Housing. He previously was employed at TD Bank and was promoted to senior legal counsel in 2020.

He served as vice-chair of TAIBU Community Health Center and director of the Scarborough Business Association. Moreover, he was a volunteer with HousingNowTO and Scarborough Transit Action.

Political career 
Myers was elected to Toronto City Council during the 2022 Toronto municipal election, replacing the late incumbent Cynthia Lai who died days before the municipal election on October 21, 2022. Due to her death, Lai's votes were not counted.

Myers ran on a platform of affordable housing, easier access to healthcare, increased funding and more buses for the Toronto Transit Commission (TTC) in wake of the Line 3 Scarborough closure, as well as maintaining the ActiveTO program. He was endorsed by the Toronto Star, Toronto & York Region Labour Council, and Progress Toronto.

Myers began his first term on council by releasing a statement alongside other councillors opposing the Better Municipal Governance Act, 2022, which is a controversial provincial legislation which would give the mayors of Toronto and Ottawa the power to pass local bylaws with only a third of city council’s support.

Electoral history

References

Notes 

Living people
Toronto city councillors
Black Canadian politicians
21st-century Canadian politicians
Year of birth missing (living people)